Favourite Attenborough Moments is the name of a television poll conducted by the UKTV Documentary channel in 2006. The poll called on members of the British public to vote for their favourite moment from Sir David Attenborough's 50-year career in broadcasting.

Format 

The format consisted of two programmes. My Favourite Attenborough Moment was the first, broadcast on 15 April 2006. Celebrity admirers of Attenborough's work (including Joanna Lumley, Björk and several presenters and producers from the BBC Natural History Unit) introduced a shortlist of twenty highlights from Attenborough's nature documentaries and advocated their particular favourites. The second programme, Your Favourite Attenborough Moment, counted down the same twenty clips in the order of votes received from the viewers. It was broadcast on 7 May 2006, the day before Attenborough's 80th birthday, and featured interviews with Attenborough in which he described the experiences of filming them.

Results 

The results are summarised below. The winning sequence was the lyrebird featured in The Life of Birds, which polled almost a quarter of the 13,000 votes cast. The mountain gorilla encounter from Life on Earth came second with 17% of the votes and the blue whale sequence from The Life of Mammals was third with 15%.

Many of the shortlisted clips are available on the BBC Earth YouTube channel. The lyrebird clip has been viewed more than 3 million times since it was first made available. Web users in the UK can also find them, along with many other clips, in the David Attenborough's Favourite Moments collection on the BBC Wildlife Finder.

References

External links 
 Your Favourite Attenborough Moment on the Eden website

2006 British television series debuts
2006 British television series endings
Documentary films about nature
David Attenborough